Gunzwil was a municipality within the district of Sursee, in the canton of Lucerne, Switzerland. On 1 January 2009 it merged with the municipality of Beromünster, becoming a village inside the new municipality of Beromünster.

History
Gunzwil was first mentioned in 1036 as Gunczwilare, though the only existing document that mentions this is a 14th Century copy. In 1173 it was mentioned as in Gunzewile.

Geography

Of this area, 78.5% was used for agricultural purposes, while 15% was forested. Of the rest of the land, 6.3% was settled (buildings or roads) and the remainder (0.1%) was non-productive (rivers, glaciers or mountains).

The municipality was located between the Suren- and Seetal valleys. It consisted of the village of Gunzwil and numerous hamlets. Since 1 January 2009 it has been part of Beromünster.

Demographics
Gunzwil had a population of 1,875, of which 5.6% were foreign nationals. Over the last 10 years the population has decreased at a rate of -1.5%. Most of the population spoke German (94.9%), with Albanian second most common (2.2%), and Italian third (0.5%).

In the 2007 election the most popular party was the CVP, which received 41.9% of the vote. The next three most popular parties were the SVP (30.4%), the FDP (16.5%) and the Green Party (5.5%).

The age distribution of the population was: children and teenagers (0–19 years old) make up 30% of the population, while adults (20–64 years old) make up 59%, and seniors (over 64 years old) make up 11%. The entire Swiss population is generally well educated. In Gunzwil about 71.3% of the population (between age 25-64) had completed either non-mandatory upper secondary education or additional higher education (either University or a Fachhochschule).

, there were 339 people employed in the primary economic sector, and about 112 businesses involved in this sector. 169 people are employed in the secondary sector and there are 26 businesses in this sector. 228 people are employed in the tertiary sector, with 42 businesses in this sector. Gunzwil had an unemployment rate of 0.86%.

The historical population is given in the following table:

References

External links
 

Former municipalities of the canton of Lucerne